Panchhari (is an upazila of Khagrachari District in the Division of Chittagong, Bangladesh.

Geography
It has 5617 households and total area 334.11 km2.

Demographics
As of the 1991 Bangladesh census, Panchhari has a population of 26,319. Males constitute 52.05% of the population, and females 47.95%. This Upazila's eighteen up population is 13,727. Panchhari has an average literacy rate of 25.4% (7+ years), and the national average of 32.4% literate.

Administration
Panchhari Upazila is divided into five union parishads: Chengi, Latiban, Logang, Panchhari, and Ultachari. The union parishads are subdivided into 7 mauzas and 220 villages.

Chairman: Sarbottom Chakma

Vice Chairman: 

Woman Vice Chairman:

Upazila Nirbahi Officer (UNO):

See also
Upazilas of Bangladesh
Districts of Bangladesh
Divisions of Bangladesh

References

Upazilas of Khagrachhari District